Van Hall is a Dutch toponymic surname meaning "from/of Hall". This indicates an origin in either the town Hall in Brummen or Halle in Bronckhorst, both in Gelderland. Currently, the form Van Hal is more common. The people with this name listed below all are descendants of Floris Adriaan van Hall (1736-1808), which family originated in Hall, Brummen:

Floris Adriaan van Hall (1791-1866), Dutch statesman, twice Prime Minister of the Netherlands
Gijs van Hall (1904–1977), Dutch politician and Mayor of Amsterdam
 (1799–1859), Dutch jurist
Suzy van Hall (1907–1978), Dutch dancer and resistance member
Walraven van Hall (1906-1945), Dutch banker and World War II resistance leader

See also
Van Hall Instituut, agricultural college named after  (1801–1874), Dutch botanist and agronomist
Van Hall Larenstein, vocational university formed via a merger of the Van Hall Instituut and IAH Larenstein

References

Dutch-language surnames
Toponymic surnames
Surnames of Dutch origin

[nl:Van Hall]]